HMM Company Limited, formerly known as Hyundai Merchant Marine, is a South Korean container transportation and shipping company.

Overview
HMM moves the largest portion of South Korea's exports, becoming the number one Korean national container carrier, especially since Hanjin Shipping was declared bankrupt and ordered to be liquidated.

The company's office network is composed of four international headquarters, 27 subsidiaries, 76 branches, five overseas offices and 10 liaison offices.

On the domestic market, HMM transports strategic materials such as crude oil, iron ore/coal and diverse special products as well as import/export goods. Earnings are eight trillion Korean won per year.

As of 2020, HMM has built and launched the world's two largest container ships in terms of TEU capacity, the HMM Algeciras with a maximum TEU capacity of 23,964, and the HMM Copenhagen with a maximum capacity of 23,820 TEU.

THE Alliance 
Along with Hapag-Lloyd, Ocean Network Express, and Yang Ming Marine Transport Corporation, HMM is a member of THE Alliance. THE Alliance is intended to provide 34 services, directly calling at 81 different ports on a monthly basis.

History

Hyundai Merchant Marine 
1970s
Company established as Asia Merchant Marine on March 25, with a capital of 200 million.
Conventional liner service opened between the Far East and the Middle East.
Tramper liner service established between Asia and the Middle East.
Container service introduced between the Far East and the Middle East.

1980s
PCC (Pure Car Carrier) service inaugurated on the Far East/Europe, Korea/Australia and Korea/India routes.
Purchased Hyundai No.1, first car carrier in Korea.
Integrated Halla Marine Transportation, Shinhan Marine Transportation, and Donghae Merchant Marine as shipping agents, and Sunil Merchant Marine as subsidiary shipper.
Launched on Korea/Australia, Canada route.
Full container service opened between the Far East and the Western Us.
Constructed and purchased the world's largest ore & coal carrier Hyundai Giant.
Merged with Donghae Merchant Marine and Shinhan Merchant Marine.
1990s
Seven of the world's largest and fastest container ships (5,551 TEU) purchased.
Designated as the first LNG operation shipping company in Korea.
Founded joint company Korea-Soviet Shipping with Chunkyung Shipping.
Joint operation with SEA-LAND initiated on Asia Europe Express route.
Acquired exclusive use of container terminals in Busan and Kwangyang.
HMM became the first shipping company worldwide to acquire ISM Code and ISO 9002 certification at the same time.
President Park Se-yong awarded the trophy for excellence in business on Marine Transport Day.
Leased private terminal in Kaohsiung, Taiwan.
Founded inland depot in Hong Kong.
Introduced the first international video-conferencing system in shipping industry (Seoul-LA).
Signed lease agreement with the Port of Tacoma President Park Se-yong awarded a Gold Tower Medal for his contribution to the shipping industry in Korea.
The New World Alliance" service begins together with APL and MOL.
Started Woodchip Carrier Service.
Established "Hyundai Fleet Management System" which covers information such as weather conditions, vessel locations and current changes.
Employed 4 female crew members.
Acquired two cruise ships, Hyundai Kumgang and Hyundai Pongnae.
Opened Hyundai Busan container terminal, the largest public container terminal in Korea.
2000s
Proclaimed the new management vision for the 21st century, 'HMM21'.
President and CEO, Choong-Shik Kim was awarded Gold Tower industrial medal in the 5th Ocean Day.
Built a 'Cyber Customer Service Center' in the HMM internet homepage.
Sold the Car Carrier division that became EUKOR.
Appointed Noh Jeong-ik as the new president and CEO.
Set up a sisterhood relationship with Beophwan-dong, Jejudo
Named Kim Seong-man as the new President (1.4)
Launched new 8,600 TEU containership Hyundai Brave (1.10)
Appointed Kim Seong-man as president and CEO
Began a slot exchange with Hanjin Shipping on the Asia-East Coast of U.S. route

2010s
Established a joint venture 'Netruck Franz' with Hyundai Logiem and SK Energy
Named Kim Seong-Man as Vice Chairman and Lee Suk-Hui as president and CEO
Joined world's largest shipping alliance, G6
Established a ship management company ‘Hyundai Ocean Service Co., Ltd.
Ordered and launched Hyundai Pride
Participated in “Pusan New Port Container Terminal Phase 2-4 Project”

2010s
Put the first ships of the HMM Algeciras-class container ships with 24,000 TEU into service

HMM Co., Ltd. 
2020s
On 9 March, Hyundai Merchant Marine board decide to rebrand the company as HMM Co., Ltd.
On 29 April, HMM held the naming ceremony for the newly constructed 23,964 TEU-class container ship HMM Algeciras, the world's largest container ship at the time of her launch.

Fleet

See also
List of largest container shipping companies
Hanjin Shipping
Ocean Network Express
Hyundai Glovis
EUKOR

References

External links

 

Shipping companies of South Korea
Container shipping companies
Companies based in Seoul
Companies listed on the Korea Exchange
Multinational companies headquartered in South Korea
South Korean brands
Hyundai Group